Eudaemonia argiphontes is a species of moth in the  family Saturniidae. It is found in Africa, including the Central African Republic, Gabon, Guinea and Equatorial Guinea.

References

Moths described in 1877
argiphontes